Zama Thembekile Anderson Ndamane (born 3 July 1964), commonly known as Zed Ndamane, is a South African cricket umpire and a former cricketer.

Ndamane was the reserve umpire during the 2009 Indian Premier League Final, and the on-field umpire during the 2005 Women's World Cup Final. He was one of the match officials at the 2004 Intercontinental Cup.

References

External links

Living people
1964 births
South African cricket umpires
People from Emthanjeni Local Municipality